Pseudoficalbia is a subgenus of the mosquito genus Uranotaenia with 146 species. It was originally created as a genus by Frederick Vincent Theobald in 1911 (the name was applied again as new in 1912); however, it was later treated as a subgenus of Uranotaenia, and then was made a synonym of the same genus. It was later restored as a subgenus by E.L. Peyton in 1972.

Species
 Uranotaenia abdita Peyton, 1977
 Uranotaenia abstrusa Peyton, 1977
 Uranotaenia albimanus da Cunha Ramos & Brunhes, 2004
 Uranotaenia albinotata da Cunha Ramos & Brunhes, 2004
 Uranotaenia albipes Peyton, 1977
 Uranotaenia ambodimanga da Cunha Ramos & Brunhes, 2004
 Uranotaenia andreae Doucet, 1962
 Uranotaenia anhydor anhydor Dyar, 1907
 Uranotaenia anhydor syntheta Dyar & Shannon, 1924
 Uranotaenia annulata Theobald, 1901
 Uranotaenia antalahaensis da Cunha Ramos & Brunhes, 2004
 Uranotaenia apicosquamata da Cunha Ramos & Brunhes, 2004
 Uranotaenia apicotaeniata Theobald, 1909
 Uranotaenia approximata Peyton, 1977
 Uranotaenia ascidiicola de Meijere, 1910
 Uranotaenia atra Theobald, 1905
 Uranotaenia bambusicola da Cunha Ramos & Brunhes, 2004
 Uranotaenia belkini Grjebine, 1979
 Uranotaenia bicincta da Cunha Ramos & Brunhes, 2004
 Uranotaenia bicolor Leicester, 1908
 Uranotaenia bifasciata da Cunha Ramos & Brunhes, 2004
 Uranotaenia bimaculata Leicester, 1908
 Uranotaenia bosseri Grjebine, 1979
 Uranotaenia boussesi da Cunha Ramos & Brunhes, 2004
 Uranotaenia breviseta da Cunha Ramos & Brunhes, 2004
 Uranotaenia browni Mattingly, 1955 (in Mattingly & Brown, 1955)
 Uranotaenia brumpti Doucet, 1951
 Uranotaenia brunhesi Grjebine, 1979
 Uranotaenia cachani (Doucet, 1950)
 Uranotaenia capelai da Cunha Ramos, 1993
 Uranotaenia carcinicola da Cunha Ramos & Brunhes, 2004
 Uranotaenia cavernicola Mattingly, 1954
 Uranotaenia colocasiae Edwards, 1928
 Uranotaenia combesi (Doucet, 1950)
 Uranotaenia comorensis da Cunha Ramos & Brunhes, 2004
 Uranotaenia confusa Peyton, 1977
 Uranotaenia contrastata da Cunha Ramos & Brunhes, 2004
 Uranotaenia cornuta da Cunha Ramos & Brunhes, 2004
 Uranotaenia damasei Grjebine, 1979
 Uranotaenia dandakaranyensis Natarajan, Rajavel & Jambulingam, 2017
 Uranotaenia demeilloni Peyton & Rattanarithikul, 1970
 Uranotaenia devemyi Hamon, 1955
 Uranotaenia diagonalis Brug, 1934
 Uranotaenia dibrugarhensis Bhattacharyya, Prakash, Mohapatra & Mahanta, 2004
 Uranotaenia donai da Cunha Ramos & Brunhes, 2004
 Uranotaenia douceti Grjebine, 1953
 Uranotaenia enigmatica Peyton, 1977
 Uranotaenia fulgens da Cunha Ramos & Brunhes, 2004
 Uranotaenia fusca Theobald, 1907
 Uranotaenia garnhami van Someren, 1948
 Uranotaenia gigantea Brug, 1931
 Uranotaenia gouldi Peyton & Klein, 1970
 Uranotaenia grenieri Doucet, 1951
 Uranotaenia grjebinei da Cunha Ramos & Brunhes, 2004
 Uranotaenia haddowi da Cunha Ramos & Brunhes, 2004
 Uranotaenia harrisoni Peyton, 1977
 Uranotaenia henrardi Edwards, 1935
 Uranotaenia henriquei da Cunha Ramos, 1993
 Uranotaenia hervyi da Cunha Ramos & Brunhes, 2004
 Uranotaenia hirsuta Boussès & Brunhes, 2013
 Uranotaenia hirsutifemora Peters, 1964
 Uranotaenia hongayi Galliard & Ngu, 1947
 Uranotaenia husaini Qutubuddin, 1947
 Uranotaenia jacksoni Edwards, 1935
 Uranotaenia jinhongensis Dong, Dong & Zhou, 2003
 Uranotaenia koli Peyton & Klein, 1970
 Uranotaenia kraussi Grjebine, 1953
 Uranotaenia laffosseae da Cunha Ramos & Brunhes, 2004
 Uranotaenia lavieri Doucet, 1950
 Uranotaenia legoffi da Cunha Ramos & Brunhes, 2004
 Uranotaenia leiboensis Chu, 1981
 Uranotaenia longitubus da Cunha Ramos & Brunhes, 2004
 Uranotaenia lousthei Boussès & Brunhes, 2013
 Uranotaenia lucyae van Someren, 1954
 Uranotaenia lui Lien, 1968
 Uranotaenia lunda da Cunha Ramos, 1993
 Uranotaenia luteola Edwards, 1934 (in Barraud, 1934)
 Uranotaenia lutescens Leicester, 1908
 Uranotaenia maculipleura Leicester, 1908
 Uranotaenia madagascarensis da Cunha Ramos & Brunhes, 2004
 Uranotaenia maikalensis Natarajan, Rajavel & Jambulingam, 2017
 Uranotaenia manakaraensis da Cunha Ramos & Brunhes, 2004
 Uranotaenia mashonaensis Theobald, 1901
 Uranotaenia mattinglyi Qutubuddin, 1951
 Uranotaenia maxima Leicester, 1908
 Uranotaenia mengi Chen, Wang & Zhao, 1989
 Uranotaenia micromelas Edwards, 1934
 Uranotaenia modesta Leicester, 1908
 Uranotaenia montana Ingram & de Meillon, 1927
 Uranotaenia moufiedi Peyton, 1977
 Uranotaenia moultoni Edwards, 1914
 Uranotaenia musarum Edwards, 1936
 Uranotaenia nepenthes (Theobald, 1912)
 Uranotaenia nigricephala da Cunha Ramos & Brunhes, 2004
 Uranotaenia nigripes (Theobald, 1905)
 Uranotaenia nigripleura da Cunha Ramos & Brunhes, 2004
 Uranotaenia nigromaculata Edwards, 1941
 Uranotaenia nivipleura Leicester, 1908
 Uranotaenia nivipous Theobald, 1912
 Uranotaenia nocticola Peyton, 1977
 Uranotaenia novobscura novobscura Barraud, 1934
 Uranotaenia novobscura ryukyuana Tanaka, Mizusawa & Saugstad, 1979
 Uranotaenia obscura Edwards, 1915
 Uranotaenia ohamai Tanaka, Mizusawa & Saugstad, 1975
 Uranotaenia ornata Theobald, 1909
 Uranotaenia ototomo da Cunha Ramos, 1993
 Uranotaenia painei Edwards, 1935
 Uranotaenia pallidipleura da Cunha Ramos & Brunhes, 2004
 Uranotaenia pandani (Theobald, 1912)
 Uranotaenia patriciae Peyton, 1977
 Uranotaenia pauliani Doucet, 1949
 Uranotaenia pilosa da Cunha Ramos & Brunhes, 2004
 Uranotaenia principenis da Cunha Ramos, 1993
 Uranotaenia propinqua Peyton, 1977
 Uranotaenia pseudoalbimanus da Cunha Ramos & Brunhes, 2004
 Uranotaenia pseudohenrardi Peters, 1955
 Uranotaenia pseudomaculipleura Peyton & Rattanarithikul, 1970
 Uranotaenia pseudoshillitonis da Cunha Ramos & Brunhes, 2004
 Uranotaenia pylei Baisas, 1946
 Uranotaenia quadrimaculata Edwards, 1929 (in Paine & Edwards, 1929)
 Uranotaenia quasimodesta Peyton, 1977
 Uranotaenia qui Dong, Dong & Zhou, 2003
 Uranotaenia quinquemaculata Bonne-Wepster, 1934
 Uranotaenia ramosa da Cunha Ramos, 1993
 Uranotaenia ravenalaphila Boussès & Brunhes, 2013
 Uranotaenia ravenalicola da Cunha Ramos & Brunhes, 2004
 Uranotaenia recondita Edwards, 1922
 Uranotaenia reinerti Peyton, 1977
 Uranotaenia rickenbachi da Cunha Ramos, 1993
 Uranotaenia rossi Delfinado, 1966
 Uranotaenia satpuraensis Natarajan, Rajavel & Jambulingam, 2017
 Uranotaenia scutostriata da Cunha Ramos & Brunhes, 2004
 Uranotaenia shillitonis Edwards, 1932
 Uranotaenia signata da Cunha Ramos, 1993
 Uranotaenia spiculosa Peyton & Rattanarithikul, 1970
 Uranotaenia spinitubus da Cunha Ramos & Brunhes, 2004
 Uranotaenia spinosa da Cunha Ramos & Brunhes, 2004
 Uranotaenia spiraculata da Cunha Ramos & Brunhes, 2004
 Uranotaenia srilankensis Peyton, 1974
 Uranotaenia stricklandi Barraud, 1926
 Uranotaenia sumethi Peyton & Rattanarithikul, 1970
 Uranotaenia tanakai Miyagi & Tome, 2013
 Uranotaenia tanzaniae da Cunha Ramos, 1993
 Uranotaenia tricolor da Cunha Ramos & Brunhes, 2004
 Uranotaenia tridentata da Cunha Ramos & Brunhes, 2004
 Uranotaenia tsaratananae Doucet, 1950
 Uranotaenia ugandae da Cunha Ramos, 1993
 Uranotaenia unguiculata pefflyi Stone, 1961
 Uranotaenia unguiculata unguiculata Edwards, 1913
 Uranotaenia xanthomelaena Edwards, 1925
 Uranotaenia yaeyamana Tanaka, Mizusawa & Saugstad, 1975
 Uranotaenia yovani van Someren, 1951

References
http://mosquito-taxonomic-inventory.info/simpletaxonomy/term/6275

References

Insect subgenera
Uranotaenia